Happy Endings: Happy Rides is an American comedy web series, created as a spin-off from the television show Happy Endings.

The web series is sponsored by car manufacturer Subaru.

Production

Production
The web series was written by Jason Berger and Jen Regan. The first two webisodes were directed by Steven Mesner, with the remaining four directed by members of the Happy Endings cast: Zachary Knighton directed the third webisode, Elisha Cuthbert the fourth, Casey Wilson the fifth and Adam Pally the sixth and final webisode.

Release
A new webisode was made available each Wednesday on ABC's website from February 29, 2012, which mirrored the air dates of the final six episodes of the TV show's second season.

Plot
The series depicts the events that follow after Penny announces she is getting rid of her storage space and selling everything inside, including her very first car. This causes everyone to remember an important milestone in their lives that took place in the car.

Cast and characters
The series stars the entire cast from Happy Endings.

 Eliza Coupe as Jane Kerkovich-Williams
 Elisha Cuthbert as Alex Kerkovich
 Zachary Knighton as Dave Rose
 Adam Pally as Max Blum
 Damon Wayans Jr. as Brad Williams
 Casey Wilson as Penny Hartz

Webisodes

Season 1 (2012)

Special (2012)

Reception
The series has received high praise, noting that it doesn't stray from the show's signature tone. It has also been praised as the webisodes "feels like a bonus episode" as they were used to promote Subaru's "First Car" promotion rather than promoting a product within the series. The actors also received praise, with some noting "the actors are in top form".

References

External links
 
 

American comedy web series
2012 web series debuts
2012 webcomic endings